Eyes of Amber and Other Stories is a novel by Joan D. Vinge published in 1979.

Plot summary
Eyes of Amber and Other Stories is a novel collection of short stories.

Reception
Greg Costikyan reviewed Eyes of Amber and Other Stories in Ares Magazine #2 and commented that "Vinge's stories are melodious, haunting, and tinged with sadness. At their best, they unify all the elements that make up good science fiction: thoughtful premises, good plotting, spare but descriptive prose, solid characterization, and emotional content."

Reviews
Review by David Pettus (1980) in Fan Plus, #1 January 1980
Review [French] by Denis Guiot (1980) in Fiction, #307
Review by Ken Methold (1983) in Omega Science Digest, March-April 1983
Kliatt

References

1979 novels